Södertäljenätverket also known as the Syriac Mafia is an Assyrian-Syriac/Aramaic criminal organisation, according to some testimonials to have 75-100 people, based in Södertälje.The criminal organization is based on family, kinship and the notion of a common origin. There is not a single person or a particular family that leads the organization, which is based on a tradition of cooperationand exchange of services within and between the families.

In September 2014 the Svea Court of Appeal in Stockholm confirmed the existence of a criminal organisation in Södertälje, with an extensive power structure with ramifications into politics and the welfare sector.
According to Police information in October 2019, the organisation is still growing and gaining more power.

References 

Assyrian gangs
Organized crime gangs
Organized crime groups in Sweden